Toilers of the Sea is a lost 1923 American silent drama film directed by Roy William Neill and starring Lucy Fox, Holmes Herbert and Horace Tesseron. It is an adaptation of Victor Hugo's novel of the same title.

Plot
As described in a film magazine review, Captain Jean and his daughter Hélène live in an Italian fishing hamlet. Captain André persuades him to induce the villagers to invest their savings in a project to purchase trading vessels. André embezzles the money and hides it in the volcanic crater of Mount Etna. Sandro, in love with Hélène, trails André to the mountains. A fight takes place, André is killed, and Sandro takes the money back to the villagers. Hélène and Sandro then wed.

Cast
 Lucy Fox as Hélène
 Holmes Herbert as Sandro
 Horace Tesseron as Captain Jean
 Dell Cawley as Captain André
 Lucius Henderson as The Priest

Production
Toilers of the Sea was filmed in Italy.

References

Bibliography
 Goble, Alan. The Complete Index to Literary Sources in Film. Walter de Gruyter, 1999.

External links
 

1923 films
1923 drama films
1920s English-language films
American silent feature films
Silent American drama films
American black-and-white films
Films directed by Roy William Neill
Seafaring films
Selznick Pictures films
1920s American films
Silent adventure films